Wikstroemia polyantha grows as a small tree up to  tall, with a stem diameter of up to . The twigs are reddish to dark brown. Inflorescences bear at least six flowers which are yellow, yellowish green or white. Fruits are red. The specific epithet polyantha is from the Greek meaning "many flowers". Habitat is forests from sea-level to  altitude. W. polyantha is found in Malaysia, Indonesia and the Philippines.

References

polyantha
Plants described in 1915
Trees of Malesia
Taxa named by Elmer Drew Merrill